Alessandro Piu (born 30 July 1996) is an Italian footballer who plays as a forward for  club Pro Patria.

Club career
Piu is a youth exponent from Empoli. He made his team debut on 24 September 2015 against Atalanta. He started in the first eleven and was replaced after 45 minutes by Marko Livaja.

He went on loan to Spezia in Serie B for the 2016–2017 season.

On 21 August 2019, he signed with Arezzo.

On 6 August 2021, he joined Pro Patria as a free agent.

International career
On 13 November 2015, he made his debut with Italy U21 side, in a 2017 European Championship qualification match against Serbia.

References

1996 births
Living people
Sportspeople from Udine
Italian footballers
Association football forwards
Serie A players
Serie B players
Serie C players
Empoli F.C. players
Spezia Calcio players
A.C. Carpi players
U.S. Pistoiese 1921 players
S.S. Arezzo players
Aurora Pro Patria 1919 players
Italy youth international footballers
Italy under-21 international footballers
Footballers from Friuli Venezia Giulia